Clube Atlético Portal, commonly known as CAP Uberlândia, is a Brazilian football club based in Uberlândia, Minas Gerais state.

History
The club was founded in 2010 by Guillherme Ferriera and the former footballer Gilson Batata, who was also the club's first head coach and he also played a friendly game for the club. The club competed in 2011 in the Copa Amvap. The club debuted in professional football competitions on August 6, 2011, in a 2011 Campeonato Mineiro Segunda Divisão game against Araxá, at Estádio Parque do Sabiá. CAP and Araxá drew 1-1. Most of the CAP's players previously defended clubs such as Uberlândia Esporte Clube, Votuporanguense and Plácido de Castro.

Stadium
Clube Atlético Portal play their home games at Estádio Parque do Sabiá. The stadium has a maximum capacity of 50,000 people.

References

External links
 Official website

Association football clubs established in 2010
Football clubs in Minas Gerais
2010 establishments in Brazil